Captain Singrid (French: Capitaine Singrid) is a 1968 adventure film directed by Jean Leduc and starring Elga Andersen, Robert Woods and Giorgia Moll. It was made as a co-production between France, Italy and Portugal. Location shooting took place in Angola.

Cast
 Elga Andersen as Singrid 
 Robert Woods as Saint-Robert 
 Giorgia Moll as Carol 
 Jean-Claude Bercq as Tarquier 
 Marc Michel as Vignal 
 Varela Silva as Taximan

References

Bibliography 
 John Wakeman. World Film Directors: 1945-1985. H.W. Wilson, 1987.

External links 
 

1968 films
Italian adventure films
French adventure films
Portuguese adventure films
1968 adventure films
1960s French-language films
Films directed by Jean Leduc
Films shot in Angola
Films set in Africa
Girls with guns films
Fictional mercenaries
Films about mercenaries
1960s French films
1960s Italian films